Siegfried Lerdon (8 August 1905 – 9 October 1964) was a German fencer. He won a bronze medal in the team foil event at the 1936 Summer Olympics.

References

1905 births
1964 deaths
German male fencers
Olympic fencers of Germany
Fencers at the 1936 Summer Olympics
Olympic bronze medalists for Germany
Olympic medalists in fencing
Sportspeople from Frankfurt
Medalists at the 1936 Summer Olympics